The Fussball Club Basel 1893 1984–85 season was their 91st season since their foundation. It was their 39th consecutive season in the top flight of Swiss football since their promotion in the 1945–46 season. FC Basel played their home games in the St. Jakob Stadium. For the second year running the club's chairman was Urs Gribi.

Overview

Pre-season
It was Ernst August Künnecke's second year as first team manager with Emil Müller as his assistant. Künnecke made amendments to the team, Walter Geisser retired and Jean-Pierre Maradan, Jörg Stohler as well as Arthur von Wartburg who had been thrown out of the squad the previous season all moved on to Grenchen. Künnecke persuaded Adrie van Kraay to join the team from Waterschei Thor. The youngsters Beat Feigenwinter (from Nordstern Basel), Livio Bordoli (from Hessen Kassel) and Ertan Irizik (from Concordia Basel) were transferred in. Basel's own youngsters Peter Nadig, Beat Sutter, Thomas Hauser, Fredy Grossenbacher and Dominique Herr were formed into team leaders.

In this season Basel played a total of 63 games. 30 matches were played in the domestic league, three in the Swiss Cup and 30 were friendly matches. Of their 30 test games, 24 ended with a victory, two were drawn, four ended with a defeat, the team scored 120 goals and conceded 37. Only three of these test games were played at home in St. Jakob Stadium, the others were all played away.

Domestic league
The 1984–85 Nationalliga A was contested by 16 teams, including the top 14 clubs from the previous season and the two sides promoted from the second level, Nationalliga B, the previous season, these being SC Zug and Winterthur. The league was contested in a double round robin format, with each club playing every other club twice, home and away. Two points were awarded for a win and one point given to each team for a draw. 

The good results in pre-season test matches, including a draw against Borussia Dortmund and victories against Karlsruher SC, SC Freiburg and Bayern Munich could not be taken over in to the domestic league games. Basel lost three of their first four matches. Then, following a run of five defeats and five draws with only one win, the team suffered one defeat too many against Lausanne-Sport on the 11 November. Basel's club chairman Urs Gribi fired Künnecke. The SC Zug match was declaired forfait at a later date. Gribi installed Müller as head coach until the end of the season and Müller was able to lead the team away from the relegation zone. Basel ended the season in eighth position, 15 points behind Servette Genève who became Swiss champions that year. In their 30 league matches Basel won eleven, drew nine and lost ten games. At the end of the championship season Basel had obtained 31 points, had scored 46 and had conceded 49 goals. Peter Nadig was the team's top league goal scorer with eleven goals and Beat Sutter second highest scorer with ten.

Swiss Cup
Basel entered the Swiss Cup in the round of 64 with an away game against lower classed FC Dürrenast. This was won 4–0. In the second round they had a home match, also against a lower classed team FC Langenthal. This match resulted in a 6–0 victory. However, with the third round home game against Servette Basels cup season came to an end because they lost the match 0–1. Aarau won the cup, beating Xamax 1–0 in the final.

Players 

 
 

 

 
 
 

 

 
 
 

Players who left the squad

Results 
Legend

Friendly matches

Pre- and mid-season

Winter break and mid-season

Nationalliga A

League matches

League table

Swiss Cup

See also
 History of FC Basel
 List of FC Basel players
 List of FC Basel seasons

References

Sources 
 Rotblau: Jahrbuch Saison 2015/2016. Publisher: FC Basel Marketing AG. 
 Die ersten 125 Jahre. Publisher: Josef Zindel im Friedrich Reinhardt Verlag, Basel. 
 The FCB squad 1984–85 at fcb-archiv.ch
 1984–85 at RSSSF

External links
 FC Basel official site

FC Basel seasons
Basel